Michael Steven Cuggy (born 18 March 1971) is an English footballer and former manager of Blyth Spartans. He played professionally for Maidstone United, making a total of 13 Football League appearances.

References

1971 births
Living people
Sportspeople from Wallsend
Footballers from Tyne and Wear
English footballers
Association football forwards
Margate F.C. players
Sunderland A.F.C. players
Maidstone United F.C. (1897) players
Blyth Spartans A.F.C. players
Dover Athletic F.C. players
English Football League players
English football managers
Blyth Spartans A.F.C. managers
National League (English football) managers